Ryu Deok-yeong of the Jeongju Ryu clan (정주 류씨) was a nobleman during the Late Kingdom of Unified Silla. He was the father of Queen Jeongdeok, those make him become the sixth father in-law of Taejo of Goryeo, the founder of Goryeo dynasty.

References

Year of birth unknown
Year of death unknown
10th-century Korean people
Silla people